YBA 2 NW is the fifth studio album of South African hip hop artist Hip Hop Pantsula, released under the CCP/EMI S.A. label on October 17, 2005 in South Africa.

Track listing

2005 albums
Hip Hop Pantsula albums